Schistura lingyunensis is a troblobitic species of stone loach found in Shadong Cave, Lingyun County in Guangxi. It is scaleless and lacks pigmentation with degenerated eyes.

References

L
Fish described in 1997
Cave fish